Sort codes are the domestic bank codes used to route money transfers between financial institutions in the United Kingdom, and in the Republic of Ireland. They are six-digit hierarchical numerical addresses that specify clearing banks, clearing systems, regions, large financial institutions, groups of financial institutions and ultimately resolve to individual branches. In the UK they continue to be used to route transactions domestically within clearance organisations and to identify accounts, while in the Republic of Ireland (a founder member of the Euro) they have been deprecated and replaced by the SEPA systems and infrastructure.

Sort codes for Northern Ireland branches of banks (codes beginning with a '9') were registered with the Irish Payment Services Organisation (IPSO) for both Northern Ireland and the Republic. These codes are used in the British clearing system and historically in the Irish system.

The sort code is usually formatted as three pairs of numbers, for example 12-34-56.  It identifies both the bank (in the first digit or the first two digits) and the branch where the account is held. Sort codes are encoded into IBANs but are not encoded into BICs.

History 
Codes began to be used in the early 20th century to facilitate the manual processing of cheques. Known as a 'national code', these had between three and five digits.

The eleven London clearing banks were each allocated a main number, with the "big five" (and the Bank of England) allocated single-digit numbers alphabetically. Lloyds Bank, for example, was allocated 3 and National Provincial was allocated 5. The remaining single digit codes were used to indicate that a cheque was from outside the London clearing system. The smaller clearing banks were allocated two-digit numbers, for example Martins was allocated 11.

The bank branches were allocated further digits by their bank to make up the entire number; some banks represented these on cheques in smaller type. Main clearing branches (usually major London branches) would have only one digit after the main number, e.g. 111. Metropolitan branches (which covered Greater London) had two digits after the main number, e.g. 1124. Country branches made up the rest of the country, and used three or more digits after the main number, e.g. 11056. They were displayed on cheques in this fashion, with the bank identifier taking precedence.

Six-digit "sorting codes" were introduced in a staggered process from 1957 as the banking industry moved towards automation. The national codes were retained but where a single digit was used to identify the bank a two-digit range was introduced. So, for example, Barclays codes went from starting with a 2 to 20, Midland from 4 to 40, etc.

List of sort codes of the United Kingdom 

In the United Kingdom the initial digits of bank sort codes were originally allocated to settlement members of the Cheque and Credit Clearing Company and the Belfast Bankers' Clearing Company. Today, sort codes are issued to any organisation that will be a direct member of a UK electronic payment network (in addition to the cheque clearing systems, this includes BACS, Faster Payments and CHAPS). Non-standard sort codes are issued to payment service providers who need an IBAN, for example for SEPA, as the sort code forms part of this.

The allocation of sort codes is managed by BACS. These numbers are six digits long, formatted into three pairs which are separated by hyphens.

Cheque clearing 
The cheque clearing system in the United Kingdom is managed by Pay.UK, following the merger of the Cheque and Credit Clearing Company, BACS and Faster Payments Ltd in 2018. Since August 2019, sterling cheque clearing has been through the Image Clearing System.

England and Wales 
In the following list the dates in parentheses give the year of merger with the present-day sort code holder, or its subsidiary.

Scotland 
Separately operated by the Committee of Scottish Clearing Bankers until 1985.

Northern Ireland 
The clearing system in Northern Ireland was operated under the Belfast Clearing Rules which were agreed by the Belfast Bankers' Clearing Company (formerly the Belfast Bankers' Clearing Committee), until the introduction of the Image Clearing System managed by Pay.UK which was completed in August 2019. Sort codes in the 90 range are managed by the Irish Payment Services Organisation (IPSO).

Sort codes of the Republic of Ireland 

Sort codes are no longer directly used in the Republic of Ireland, although they still form part of the underlying structure of account numbers. As a part of the Eurozone, all aspects of the SEPA system are fully implemented and adhered to. This means that all domestic transactions, including Direct Debit and interbank transfers are processed using an IBAN through the SEPA system. The Irish electronic clearing systems, including those run by the Irish Retail Electronic Payments Clearing Company Ltd, which entered voluntary liquidation in late 2014, have been retired and replaced by SEPA. Domestic cheques continue to be processed by the Irish Paper Clearing Company CLG.

Historically, the Irish banking system shared the sort code structure used in the UK, but operated as a separate system since the Irish pound broke the link with sterling in March 1979. Codes are issued by the Banking and Payments Federation Ireland (BPFI) which replaced IPSO in 2014.

The full list of sort codes used in Ireland is as follows:

Note: A large number of lower volume users and smaller banks share the 99 XX XX code and there are at least three users of the 93 XX XX codes assigned primarily to AIB.

Irish bank account numbers are now presented in the IBAN format as follows:

IE97 BANK 9799 9912 3456 78

This corresponds to the fictitious sort code: 97-99-99 and account: 12345678, prefixed by ISO Country code: IE, IBAN check digits 97 and Bank Identifier: BANK

Codes in the 70 range – "walks" 
Numbers starting with a '7' (after the 1960s, '70') were reserved for the large number of London offices of banks which were not members of the London Clearing. Individual sort codes were allocated on a one-off basis to the many London offices of private and foreign banks. Cheques drawn on these banks were colloquially known within the banking industry as 'walks' because they were cleared by being hand-delivered ("walked") to the drawee banks by messengers from the Clearing House. By the 1990s, most of these banks had been issued with sort codes within the ranges of the various clearing banks which, from then on, acted as clearing agents for them; the practice of "walking" cheques was ended. For cheques drawn on banks that had not made such an arrangement, the cheques were posted to the drawee bank, who would settle them by a cheque drawn on a clearing bank.

International clearance 
Within the Eurozone, only IBAN numbers are required. Transfers to and from the United Kingdom, the United States and Australia and any other countries outside the Eurozone continue to use international networks and require a combination of IBAN (or a domestic account and sorting/routing code) alongside a BIC code to identify the institution sending and receiving payments. Characters 9 to 14 of British and Irish IBANs hold the bank account sort code.

In some countries there is no direct equivalent of sort codes as the bank and branch codes are maintained separately from each other in those countries. Other countries, however, have or had codes which are equivalent to sort codes, but with formats unique to the country concerned.  Examples include:
 Germany/Austria: Bankleitzahl (BLZ) – superseded by and incorporated into the IBAN as part of SEPA standardization
 Switzerland: Bankenclearing-Nummer (BC-Nummer)
 Australia: Bank-State-Branch (BSB)
 Canada: Transit Code
 Sweden: Clearingnummer
 Ukraine: MFO
 India: IFSC (Indian Financial System Code)

The codes listed above for Germany, Austria, Switzerland and Sweden are incorporated into the IBANs for those countries.

See also 
 Banks of the United Kingdom
 Industry Sorting Code Directory
 Bank state branch
 Bank Identifier Code
 International Bank Account Number

Sources 
 UK Clearings Directory 2005 (p. 297) The Association for Payment Clearing Services

References

External links
 Clearing Codes Rules – the rules for sorting codes, managed by Bacs
 Faster Payments sort code checker – shows which payment systems are supported for a given UK sort code
 Identify a bank from the sort code – display bank, branch and contact information
 Find branch, clearing information and SWIFT BIC from a sort code - shows branch details, clearing information and equivalent SWIFT BIC

Banking terms
Bank codes
Banking in the United Kingdom
Banking in the Republic of Ireland